Chloroclystis viridata is a moth in the family Geometridae. It was described by Warren in 1895. It is found on Peninsular Malaysia and from Sulawesi to New Guinea.

Subspecies
Chloroclystis viridata viridata (Peninsular Malaysia)
Chloroclystis viridata phaeina Prout, 1958 (Sulawesi to New Guinea)

References

External links

Moths described in 1895
viridata